Narreme is the basic unit of narrative structure. According to Helmut Bonheim (2000), the concept of narreme was developed three decades earlier by Eugene Dorfman and expanded by Henri Wittmann, The narreme is to narratology what the sememe is to semantics, the morpheme is to morphology and the phoneme to phonology. The narreme, however, has yet to be persuasively defined in practice.  In interpretative narratology constrained in a framework of principles and parameters, narration is the projection of a narreme N0, the abstract head of a narrative macrostructure where Nn dominates immediately Nn-1 (Wittmann 1995).

See also
 Mytheme
 Narratology
 Narrative
 Narrative structure

Notes

Bibliography
Bonheim, Helmut. 2000. "Shakespeare's narremes." In: Shakespeare Survey 53: Shakespeare and narrative. Edited by Peter Holland. Cambridge: Cambridge University Press, pp. 1–11.
Dorfman,  Eugène. 1969.  The narreme in the medieval romance epic:  An introduction to narrative structures.  Toronto:  University of Toronto Press.
Schärfe, Henrik. 2004. CANA: A study in computer-aided narrative analysis. Aalborg University, Dept. of Communication: Ph.D. dissertation.
Shivel, Gail. 2009. "World of Warcraft: The Murloc is the Message." Symplokê 17:1-2.205-213 
Tusseau, Jean-Pierre & Henri Wittmann.  1975.  "Règles de narration dans les chansons de geste et le roman courtois".  Folia linguistica 7.401-12.
Wittmann, Henri. 1974. "Topics in the theory of narrative algorithms." Travaux linguistiques de l'Université du Québec à Trois-Rivières 3.1.
Wittmann, Henri. 1975.  "Théorie des narrèmes et algorithmes narratifs".  Poetics  4:1.19-28.
Wittmann, Henri. 1995. "La structure de base de la syntaxe narrative dans les contes et légendes du créole haïtien." Poétiques et imaginaires: francopolyphonie littéraire des Amériques. Edited by Pierre Laurette & Hans-George Ruprecht. Paris: L'Harmattan, pp. 207–218.

 
Narratology